was a town located in Fukayasu District, Hiroshima Prefecture, Japan.

As of 2003, the town had an estimated population of 40,498 and a density of 712.87 persons per km². The total area was 56.81 km².

On March 1, 2006, Kannabe was merged into the expanded city of Fukuyama.

Dissolved municipalities of Hiroshima Prefecture